Kim Dameron (born November 7, 1960) is an American football coach. He is the head football coach at Southside High School in Fort Smith, Arkansas, a position he has held since 2020. Dameron served as the head football coach at Eastern Illinois University from 2014 to 2018, compiling a record of 27–30.

Head coaching record

References

External links
 Eastern Illinois profile

1960 births
Living people
American football wide receivers
American football defensive backs
Arkansas Razorbacks football coaches
Arkansas Razorbacks football players
Cincinnati Bearcats football coaches
Cornell Big Red football coaches
Eastern Illinois Panthers football coaches
Kansas Jayhawks football coaches
Louisiana Tech Bulldogs football coaches
Louisiana–Monroe Warhawks football coaches
Missouri State Bears football coaches
Murray State Racers football coaches
Ole Miss Rebels football coaches
Stephen F. Austin Lumberjacks football coaches
Toronto Argonauts coaches
UNLV Rebels football coaches
High school football coaches in Arkansas